Walerian Borowczyk (21 October 1923 – 3 February 2006) was an internationally known Polish film director described by film critics as a 'genius who also happened to be a pornographer'. He directed 40 films between 1946 and 1988. Borowczyk settled in Paris in 1959. As a film director, he worked mainly in France.

Biography
Born in Kwilcz near Poznań, Borowczyk studied painting at the Academy of Fine Arts in Kraków, then devoted himself to painting and lithography, including the creation of posters for the cinema, which earned him a national prize in 1953. His early films were surreal animations, some only a few seconds long, including several comic abecedaria. His most acclaimed early films were Był sobie raz (Time Upon a Once) (1957) and Dom (House) (1958, with Jan Lenica). 

In 1959, Borowczyk immigrated to France and settled in Paris. He worked with Chris Marker for Les Astronautes. Major works of this period include the stop motion film Renaissance (1964), which uses reverse motion to depict various destroyed objects (a prayer book, a stuffed toy, etc.) re-assembling themselves, only to be destroyed again when the last object (a bomb) is complete. In 1967, he directed his first animated feature film, Théâtre de Monsieur & Madame Kabal: un film dessiné pour les adultes (Mr. and Mrs. Kabal's Theatre).

Borowczyk moved into live-action feature film with Goto, l'île d'amour (Goto, Isle of Love) (1968) and Blanche (1971), both tales of illicit love thwarted by jealous husbands, and both starring his own wife, Ligia Branice. One of his most appreciated films of this period, Dzieje grzechu (A Story of Sin) (1975), which was nominated for Palme d'or, is an adaptation of a Polish literary classic by Stefan Żeromski. Like his 1966 short film Rosalie (a Guy de Maupassant adaptation and a Silver Bear winner), Dzieje grzechu had successfully rendered the themes of seduction and infanticide. Contes immoraux (Immoral Tales) (1973) and his later work, including Interno di un convento (Behind Convent Walls) (1977) (inspired by Promenades dans Rome of Stendhal) and Cérémonie d'amour (Rites of Love) (1988) have been controversial, lauded by some for their unique surrealist vision and derided by others as contentless pornography. Especially, La Bête (The Beast, 1975) (based on the novel Lokis by Prosper Mérimée and originally conceived in 1972 as a film on its own, but then in 1973 as the fifth story in Contes immoraux) was seen by many as a decline in the director's career after Dzieje grzechu, except in France, where it was hailed by prominent critics such as Ado Kyrou. His 1980 film Lulu was based on the eponymous character created by Frank Wedekind.

In 1981, he made Docteur Jekyll et les femmes (Blood of Dr Jekyll), a version of the Jekyll and Hyde story starring Udo Kier and Patrick Magee and depicting Jekyll's transformation as a violent rebellion against Victorian morality. In his 1988 book Nightmare Movies, Kim Newman described the film as "dark, misanthropic and interestingly offensive". He made a brief return to animation with his 1984 short film Scherzo infernal. In 1987, he directed Emmanuelle 5, an installment of the Emmanuelle series, that was also released in a hardcore video-only version. He was unhappy with the project due to a dispute concerning the casting of lead actress Monique Gabrielle. In 1988 and 1990, he directed four episodes for the series Série rose: Les Chefs d’œuvre de la littérature érotique on M6.

Many of Borowczyk's films use historical settings, including Ars Amandi: l'arte di amare (The Art of Love) (1983), set in the time of Ovid (and featuring the poet as a character); Blanche, set during the Middle Ages; and three of the four episodes in Contes immoraux, set respectively in the nineteenth century, the sixteenth century, and the Borgia papacy.

A number of his films (such as the "tale" La Marée (The Tide) in Contes immoraux, the 1976 La Marge (The Streetwalker), the episode Marceline in Les Héroïnes du mal: Margherita, Marceline, Marie (Immoral Women) (1979), and Cérémonie d'amour) were based on stories by André Pieyre de Mandiargues. A less usual product of this cooperation was Une collection particulière of 1973, a representation of Borowczyk's collection of pornographic items, with Mandiargues having written (and read) the narration.

Borowczyk was the author of two books; Anatomia diabła (Anatomy of Devil) (1992) and Moje polskie lata (My Polish Years) (2002).

He died of heart failure in Paris in 2006, aged 82.

Legacy
The nightmarish Jeux des anges (1964, aka The Games of Angels), an expressionist evocation of the horrors of Nazi concentration camps, was selected by Terry Gilliam as one of the ten best animated films of all time.

Filmography
Film

Accolades
 Nominated: BAFTA Award for Best Animated Film — Dom (1960) (shared with Jan Lenica)
 Won: Special Jury Award for Best Short Film — Le concert de M. et Mme. Kabal (1963)
 Won: Special Mention Award for Best Short Film — Rosalie (1966)
 Won: Silver Berlin Bear for Best Short Film — Rosalie (1966)
 Won: Special Jury Prize — Rosalie (1967)
 Won: Interfilm Award — Théâtre de Monsieur & Madame Kabal (1967)
 Won: Interfilm Grand Prix — Blanche (1972)
 Nominated: Palme d'Or  — Dzieje grzechu (1975)
 Won: Maria Award for Best Director — Docteur Jekyll et les femmes (1981)

References

Further reading
Boro, L'Île d'Amour (2015), edited by Kamila Kuc, Kuba Mikurda, and Michał Oleszczyk. 
Immoral Tales: European Sex & Horror Movies 1956-1984 (1994) by Cathal Tohill and Pete Tombs (with a chapter dedicated to Borowczyk). 
Nightmare Movies (1988) by Kim Newman. 
Unquiet Dreams: The Bestiary of Walerian Borowczyk (2015), by Simon Strong, 
 Walerian Borowczyk: Cinema of Erotic Dreams (2008), by Jeremy Mark Robinson, Crescent Moon Publisher 2008, 
 Matthew Coniam. "Angel Games: The Early Films of Walerian Borowczyk" in Andy Black (ed), Necronomicon: The Journal of Horror and Erotic Cinema: Book Two, London: Creation Books, 1998, pp. 79–87.

External links

Walerian Borowczyk, bio and filmography at culture.pl
Where to Begin with Walerian Borowczyk

1923 births
2006 deaths
People from Międzychód County
Polish animators
Stop motion animators
Polish film directors
Polish animated film directors
Polish emigrants to France
Polish poster artists
Polish erotic artists
Horror film directors
Recipients of the State Award Badge (Poland)